This is the list of äkims of Kostanay Region that have held the position since 1992.

List of Äkims 

 Kenjebek Ükin (7 February 1992 – 18 November 1993)
 Baltaş Tūrsymbaev (18 November 1993 – 29 September 1995)
 Toqtarbai Qadambaev (29 September 1995 – 19 August 1998)
 Ömırzaq Şökeev (19 August 1998 – 20 March 2004)
 Sergey Kulagin (20 March 2004 – 20 January 2012)
 Nūraly Säduaqasov (20 January 2012 – 11 September 2015)
 Arhimed Mūhambetov (11 September 2015 – present)

References 

Government of Kazakhstan